Kamrunnahar Azad Swapna is a Bangladeshi film actress. She won the Bangladesh National Film Award for Best Child Artist for the film Mayer Dabi (1986).

Selected films
 Mayer Dabi (1986)

Awards and nominations
National Film Awards

References

External links

Bangladeshi film actresses
Best Child Artist National Film Award (Bangladesh) winners
Year of birth missing (living people)
Living people